Anthony St Leger may refer to:

Anthony St Leger (Lord Deputy of Ireland) (1496–1559)
Anthony St Leger (British Army officer) (1731–1786), Member of Parliament for Grimsby and Governor of St Lucia
Anthony St Leger (Master of the Rolls) ( 1535–1613), English-born judge and Master of the Rolls in Ireland